Ferndale Colliery was a series of nine coal mines, located close to the village of Ferndale, Rhondda Cynon Taf in the Rhondda Valley, South Wales.

History
The first development was by David Davis of Blaengwawr from 1857, in accessing the high quality steam coal and at a greater depth, he spurred others into tapping into the "Black Gold". Over the following 50 years, eight further pits were created.

Ferndale No.1 was developed on the land of the farm at Blaenllechau, within the borough of Ferndale. The following four pits were also within the village borough of Ferndale, while the last four were within the boundaries of neighbouring village Tylorstown. These later pits were also referred to as Tylorstown No.6 through No.9. However, later consolidation within the areas mining and pit complex eventually connected all nine of the mines. Hence the whole development was called Ferndale Colliery, from the completion of No.9 in 1907 by D. Davis & Sons Ltd. onwards. This allowed the complex to work the coal and ironstone of the: Two Feet Nine; Four Feet; Five Feet; Bute; Gellideg; Red; and Yard seams.

By the 1930s, when most of the complex was within the ownership of Powell Duffryn, the accessible coal reserves had been exhausted from the shallower shafts. Resultantly, their pit head workings were closed on economic grounds, although the workable underground coal faces were consolidated into the remaining shafts.

By the time of World War II and the Bevin Boys, only three of the original pits were still worked. These continued operation successfully under nationalisation from 1947, until the entire complex was finally closed by the National Coal Board in 1959.

Disasters
Two large colliery disasters occurred in Ferndale during the 19th century.

On Friday 8 November 1867, the whole district was shaken by two consecutive explosions at Ferndale No.1. Rescuers were hampered by roof falls, and with the air so foul, with some trepidation the furnace which powered the ventilation was relit. It took a month to recover the remains of the 178 men and boys, with most bodies showing signs of severe burning, and many so badly disfigured it made identification impossible. At the subsequent enquiry, the lamp keeper stated that safety locks had been tampered with, and incidents regularly occurred that breached the company's rules. Although reported to the mine manager, these breaches were ignored. The jury concluded:

Just 17 months later, on 10 June 1869, another explosion occurred killing 53 men and boys. The resultant inquest criticised the managers of the pit for not implementing all the recommendations made after the 1867 explosion. Further they criticised the pits ventilation system, which they concluded did not manage to properly distribute air throughout all the pit.

On 13 February 1908, 55-year-old former Private Thomas Chester, who 29 years earlier had been one of the defenders during the Battle of Rorke's Drift by thousands of Zulu warriors, was killed in the railway sidings of the coal washery at No.5 pit. Working as a coal trimmer, after allowing two wagons to pass, he stepped onto the railway tracks to break up a lump of coal which had fallen onto the empty road leading to No.1 pit screens. He was knocked down and killed by a wagon, which was being lowered towards the screens, not aware that others wagons were to follow.

On January 26, 1911, 22 year old Leonard Henry Rees, was killed at Ferndale No. 1 from a fall of roof stone at working face. He left behind a young wife, Ada, and 4 month old daughter, Irene.

Ferndale pits

References

External links
Ferndale Collieries at BBC
Ferndale Collieries at WelshCoalMines.co.uk
Ferndale Collieries at Rhondda Cynon Taf

Buildings and structures in Rhondda Cynon Taf
Coal mines in Rhondda Cynon Taf
Underground mines in Wales
Coal mining disasters in Wales
1867 mining disasters
1869 mining disasters